Crocus City Mall is a shopping mall located in Krasnogorsk, a western suburb of Moscow, Russia.

Development
Developed by Aras Agalarov's Crocus International, the site is located near the Moscow Oblast Administrative HQ, just outside Moscow's MKAD ring road. Built of natural stone in a mixture between neo-classical and oriental architectural styles, the two-storey building opened in 2002.

Transport
The  paid for the Moscow Metro railway station at Myakinino to be additionally planned and built on the extension of the Arbatsko-Pokrovskaya Line, located between Volokolamskaya and Strogino stations. Added as a single-platform ground-based station, it was built as a two-platform underground development, thanks to Crocus's funding input. Myakinino opened on 26 December 2009 which is the first station to be built outside Moscow.

Present
Today it houses retailers, including:
Clothing: Agent Provocateur, Aquascutum, Armani, Calvin Klein, JLO by Jennifer Lopez, Philipp Plein, Vivienne Westwood
Children's wear: Steiff
Housewares: Royal Doulton
Accessories: Bally, Faberge, Land Rover, Wedgwood

Crocus Expo

Crocus Expo is the adjacently located trade fair and business centre, also built, run and operated by Crocus International. It is the largest business centre in Russia.

Since 2011, Crocus hosts annual video game exhibition Igromir, which was moved there from VDNKh exhibition center due to an increasing number of visitors. Over a hundred thousand visitors attend Igromir in Crocus each year. In 2014 Crocus Expo also hosted the first Comic-Con Russia and in 2016 it received a bomb threat via phone call which caused its evacuation. A concert hall in the neighboring Crocus City Hall received similar threat a year later.

References

External links

Crocus City Mall in English

Shopping malls in Russia
Buildings and structures in Moscow
Krasnogorsky District, Moscow Oblast
Shopping malls established in 2002